Utilitas is a quarterly peer-reviewed academic journal covering political philosophy and jurisprudence published by Cambridge University Press. It was established in 1989 and the editor-in-chief is Dale E. Miller (Old Dominion University).

Abstracting and indexing 
The journal is abstracted and indexed in:

External links 
 

Political philosophy journals
Cambridge University Press academic journals
Quarterly journals
English-language journals
Publications established in 1989